Chromocene is the organochromium compound with the formula [Cr(C5H5)2]. Like structurally related metallocenes, chromocene readily sublimes in a vacuum and is soluble in non-polar organic solvents. It is more formally known as bis(η5-cyclopentadienyl)chromium(II).

Synthesis
Ernst Otto Fischer, who shared the 1973 Nobel Prize in Chemistry for work on sandwich compounds, first described the synthesis of chromocene. One simple method of preparation involves the reaction of chromium(II) chloride with sodium cyclopentadienide:
CrCl2 + 2 NaC5H5 → Cr(C5H5)2 + 2 NaCl
Such syntheses are typically conducted in tetrahydrofuran. Decamethylchromocene, Cr[C5(CH3)5]2, can be prepared analogously from LiC5(CH3)5.  Chromocene can also be prepared from chromium(III) chloride in a redox process:
2 CrCl3 + 6 NaC5H5 → 2 Cr(C5H5)2 + C10H10 + 6 NaCl

Structure and bonding
The structure of chromocene has been verified by X-ray crystallography. The average Cr–C bond length is 215.1(13) pm.
Each molecule contains an atom of chromium bound between two planar systems of five carbon atoms known as cyclopentadienyl (Cp) rings in a sandwich arrangement, which is the reason its formula is often abbreviated as Cp2Cr. Chromocene is structurally similar to ferrocene, the prototype for the metallocene class of compounds. 

With only 16 valence electrons, it does not follow the 18-electron rule.  It is a paramagnetic compound.

Reactions
The main reactivity associated with chromocene follow from it being highly reducing and the lability of the Cp ligands.

The complex exhibits diverse reactions, usually involving displacement of one cyclopentadienyl ring.  Carbonylation has been examined in detail, leads ultimately to chromium hexacarbonyl. An intermediate is cyclopentadienylchromium tricarbonyl dimer:
2 Cr(C5H5)2 + 6 CO  →   [Cr(C5H5)(CO)3]2 + "(C5H5)2"
Chromocene provides a convenient route for preparing the anhydrous form of chromium(II) acetate, a useful precursor to other chromium(II) compounds.  The reaction involves the displacement of cyclopentadienyl ligands by the formation of cyclopentadiene:
 4 CH3CO2H  +  2 Cr(C5H5)2  →   Cr2(O2CCH3)4  +  4 C5H6

Chromocene decomposes on contact with silica gel to give the Union Carbide catalyst for ethylene polymerization, although other synthetic routes exist for the formation of this important catalyst.

Safety
Chromocene is highly reactive toward air and could ignite upon exposure to the atmosphere.

References

Organochromium compounds
Metallocenes
Cyclopentadienyl complexes